Siyin Ywa or Thing Unau, also known as Gyothonbin, in Burmese is a large village under the present  Sagaing Division of Burma, adjoining to Chin State.

History
This area was a deep jungle until 1930, when a group of people led by Pu Thuam Kam started habitat especially intended for Sizang Christians, and registered the village as Siyin Ywa and Thing Unau in the office of Mawlaih Khayaing or Mawlaih District (Gyothonbin in Burmese, literally means "three goke trees").

Pu Thuam Kam was one of the sons of Pu Hang Suangh of the Sizang ethnic group of Burma. He also belonged to Tong Seal clan. Pu Tong Seal was a very famous ruler of 1340 AD over nine administered units surrounding the Sizang region. Pu Thuam Kam had three sons, Pu Do Pome, Pu Suangh Kho Pome, and Pu Suang Za Khup.

Populated places in Sagaing Region